A by-election was held in Essonne's 1st constituency on 18 November 2018, with a second round on 25 November as no candidate secured a majority of votes in the first round. The by-election was prompted by the resignation of Manuel Valls to run for the mayoralty of Barcelona in the 2019 municipal elections.

2017 election result

2018 by-election result

References

External links 
Results of past legislative by-elections from the Ministry of the Interior 

2018 elections in France
2018
November 2018 events in France